The 1914 East Galway by-election was held on 4 December 1914.  The by-election was held due to the death of the incumbent Irish Parliamentary MP, John Roche.  It was won by the Irish Parliamentary candidate James Cosgrave who was unopposed due to a War-time electoral pact.

References

1914 elections in Ireland
By-elections to the Parliament of the United Kingdom in County Galway constituencies
1914 elections in the United Kingdom
Unopposed by-elections to the Parliament of the United Kingdom (need citation)